Ore Raththam is a 1987 Indian Tamil-language political drama film directed by K. Sornam and written by M. Karunanidhi. The film stars Karthik, Bhagyalakshmi, Madhuri, Kishmu, Manorama, Pandian, Seetha, M. K. Stalin and Radha Ravi. It is based on Karunanidhi's novel of the same name, which was serialised in the magazine Kungumam. The film was released on 8 May 1987.

Plot

Cast 
 Karthik as the rigid religionist's son
 M. K. Stalin as Nandhakumar
 Bhagyalakshmi as Mercy
 Madhuri
 Kishmu as the rigid religionist
 Manorama as the harassed wife
 Pandiyan
 Seetha as the straying girl
 Radha Ravi
 Senthil

Production 
Ore Raththam was a story which was serialised in the magazine Kungumam. The author M. Karunanidhi adapted it for the screen with the same title. His son Stalin made his cinematic acting debut with this film.

Soundtrack 
The soundtrack was composed by Devendran.

Release and reception 
Ore Raththam was released on 8 May 1987. N. Krishnaswamy of The Indian Express liked the film because "most of the characters get a say, the focus shifts to each of them one time or another". He also praised the narration, dialogue, background score, camera work, and editing. Jayamanmadhan of Kalki wrote .

References

External links 
 

1980s political drama films
1980s Tamil-language films
Films based on Indian novels
Films directed by K. Sornam
Films scored by Devendran
Films with screenplays by M. Karunanidhi
Indian political drama films